Pakko Qillo (Strong Fort) is a fort in Hyderabad, Sindh.

Etymology 
The fort was formerly known as Pakka Qilla (Urdu) and Pacco Qillo (English), but the name was changed after complaints from the native Sindhi populace.

Construction
The Fort was constructed on the hillock known locally as Gunjy, by Mian Ghulam Shah Kalhoro, around 1768 when he founded the city of Hyderabad.

History
During Talpur rule over Sindh, Mir Fateh Ali Khan abandoned Khudabad and shifted his capital to Hyderabad in 1789. He used the Hyderabad Fort as a residence and a place in which to hold his court. He added a Haram and other buildings to accommodate the ruling family and his relations. To enable residents to fulfil their religious obligations, he also commissioned the building of mosques. During this period of the Mirs the fort gradually became surrounded by the shabby working-class homes. After defeating the Mirs in the Battle of Miani in 1843, the British occupied the fort. Blasts in the fort, later on, destroyed most of the buildings and houses of the public. In 1857, the British razed most of the remaining buildings to the ground to make room for military accommodation and stores.

Gallery

See also

 List of forts in Pakistan
 List of cultural heritage sites in Sindh
 List of cultural heritage sites in Pakistan

References

Archaeological sites in Sindh
Forts in Sindh
Hyderabad District, Pakistan
Tourist attractions in Hyderabad, Sindh